This is a list of Danish football transfers in the 2017 summer transfer window by club. Only clubs in the Danish Superliga are included.

Danish Superliga

AaB

In:

Out:

AGF

In:

Out:

Brøndby

In:

Out:

Copenhagen

In:

Out:

Helsingør

In:

Out:

Hobro

In:

Out:

Horsens

In:

Out:

Lyngby

In:

Out:

Midtjylland

In:

Out:

Nordsjælland

In:

Out:

OB

In:

Out:

Randers

In:

Out:

Silkeborg

In:

Out:

SønderjyskE

In:

Out:

References

Denmark
Transfers
2017
2016–17 in Danish football